Michel Bernard Goulet (born April 21, 1960) is a Canadian former professional ice hockey forward who played for the Birmingham Bulls in the World Hockey Association and the Quebec Nordiques and Chicago Blackhawks in the National Hockey League. He was also a two-time Canada Cup champion with Team Canada. He was inducted into the Hockey Hall of Fame in 1998.

Playing career

WHA
Goulet played his first professional season with the Birmingham Bulls of the WHA during the 1978–79 season in which he scored 28 goals and 58 points. Following the NHL-WHA merger, Goulet was declared eligible for the 1979 entry draft and was selected by the Quebec Nordiques.

NHL
Goulet was one of the NHL's most prolific scorers during the 1980s. He achieved 50 goals in a season in four consecutive years, starting with the 1982–83 season, and became one of the centrepieces of the team along with the Šťastný brothers.

During the 1989–90 season, in which the Nordiques finished with a record of 12 wins, 61 losses and seven ties and failed to make the playoffs for the second consecutive season, Goulet was traded to the Chicago Blackhawks, along with goalie Greg Millen and a sixth round pick at 1991 NHL entry draft, for Everett Sanipass, Dan Vincelette and Mario Doyon.

On March 16, 1994, during a game at the Montreal Forum, Goulet crashed into the end boards, striking his head and causing a severe concussion. Goulet announced his retirement from the NHL shortly after, as a result of the incident.

Post-retirement
On March 16, 1995, exactly one year after Goulet's career-ending injury, his number 16 was retired by the Nordiques before a large crowd at le Colisée de Québec, where he enjoyed his most productive years. He was inducted into the Hockey Hall of Fame in 1998 alongside former teammate Peter Šťastný. In 1089 NHL games he recorded 548 goals and 604 assists for 1152 points.

While Goulet never won a Stanley Cup as a player, he did win the cup with the Colorado Avalanche in 1996 and 2001 as director of player personnel.

Goulet was a scout for the Calgary Flames until the end of the 2015-16 NHL season. He became a scout for the Anaheim Ducks at the start of the 2017-18 season.

Honours
In 2012, he was inducted into the World Hockey Association Hall of Fame in the “Legends of the Game” category.

Career statistics

Regular season and playoffs

International

See also
 List of NHL statistical leaders
 List of NHL players with 1,000 points
 List of NHL players with 500 goals

References

External links
 

1960 births
Living people
Anaheim Ducks scouts
Birmingham Bulls players
Calgary Flames scouts
Canadian ice hockey forwards
Chicago Blackhawks players
Colorado Avalanche executives
Hockey Hall of Fame inductees
Ice hockey people from Quebec
National Hockey League All-Stars
National Hockey League first-round draft picks
National Hockey League players with retired numbers
People from Saguenay–Lac-Saint-Jean
Quebec Nordiques draft picks
Quebec Nordiques players
Quebec Remparts players
Stanley Cup champions